The Bentley Subglacial Trench is a vast topographic trench in Marie Byrd Land, West Antarctica, 80°S, 115°W.  At 2,555 meters (8,382 ft) below sea level, it (along with the deepest points within the adjacent Byrd Subglacial Basin) is among the lowest points on the surface of the Earth not covered by ocean, although it is covered by ice. (See Extremes on Earth and Vestfold Hills). 

The trench was named in 1961 after Charles R. Bentley who was the geophysicist in charge of the scientific expeditions in West Antarctica in 1957–59 that led to its discovery.

Starting in 2016 some hot anomalies were detected beneath Bentley Subglacial Trench and Mount Sidley volcano.

Notes

References
 Central Intelligence Agency, World Factbook.  Retrieved October 28, 2008.
 MapPlanet, Retrieved October 28, 2008.
 TheSpot, Retrieved OCtober 04, 2017
 AGUPublications, Retrieved October, 04, 2017.

See also
Extreme points of Antarctica
Extremes on Earth
Extreme points of Earth
Vestfold Hills
West Antarctic Rift System
Jakobshavn Isbræ

Depressions (geology)
Valleys of Antarctica
Landforms of Marie Byrd Land